Gambetta tram stop is located on line  of the tramway de Bordeaux.

Situation
The station is in Bordeaux on Rue Vital Carles, near the corner with Rue de la Porte Dijeaux.

Junctions 
Junctions with the following lines: Place Gambetta

TBC Network
 Réseau -Bus-

Trans Gironde Network

Close by 
 Cours de l'Intendance
 Place Gambetta (Bordeaux) (on French Wikipedia)

See also 
 TBC
 Tramway de Bordeaux

References

External links
 Bordeaux Citadis 402 - Gambetta (Tramway B), video of the stop on YouTube

Bordeaux tramway stops
Tram stops in Bordeaux
Railway stations in France opened in 2004